Process is a 2004 French film written and directed by C.S. Leigh. The film follows an actress (portrayed by Béatrice Dalle) as she is trying to commit suicide. It also features Guillaume Depardieu, Julia Faure, Daniel Duval, Leos Carax among others. The film was produced by Humbert Balsan and Mark Westaway and features an original score composed by Welsh musician John Cale. It also features "That's Entertainment", a song by English band The Jam.

Reception 
In a positive review for Variety, Leslie Felperin called it "one of the most adventurous works screened at this year’s [2004] Berlinale." Writing for The Guardian, critic Peter Bradshaw gave it two out of five stars.

References

External links
 

2004 films
2004 drama films
French drama films
2000s French-language films
Films set in Paris
2000s French films